Fredrick M. "Fred" Stewart (born 1948) is an American bridge player from Bloomington, New York.
Stewart has won the Cavendish Invitational Pairs three times and has won 8 North American Bridge Championships .

Bridge accomplishments

Wins

 Cavendish Invitational Pairs (3) 1993, 1996, 2011 
 North American Bridge Championships (8)
 von Zedtwitz Life Master Pairs (1) 1981 
 Wernher Open Pairs (1) 1995 
 Blue Ribbon Pairs (1) 1987 
 Jacoby Open Swiss Teams (2) 1992, 2012 
 Senior Knockout Teams (1) 2012 
 Mitchell Board-a-Match Teams (1) 1995 
 Reisinger (1) 1984

Runners-up

 Cavendish Invitational Pairs (1) 1986 
 North American Bridge Championships (7)
 Wernher Open Pairs (1) 2004 
 Blue Ribbon Pairs (2) 1994, 2002 
 Grand National Teams (1) 1991 
 Vanderbilt (1) 1999 
 Senior Knockout Teams (1) 2010 
 Reisinger (1) 1995

Notes

American contract bridge players
Living people
1948 births
Date of birth missing (living people)
Place of birth missing (living people)
People from Andes, New York